Kwun Tong Central is one of the 40 constituencies in the Kwun Tong District of Hong Kong. The constituency was created in 1994.

The constituency has an estimated population of 16,518.

Councillors represented

Election results

2010s

References

1994 establishments in Hong Kong
Constituencies of Kwun Tong District Council
Constituencies established in 1994
Kwun Tong